The River Alre (also, occasionally, Arle) is a tributary of the River Itchen in Hampshire in the south of England.

The river is a classic English chalk stream with a shallow gravel bed and fast flowing waters, fed year-round by chalk springs. Through Bishop's Sutton it forms a good natural trout fishery and later supports a watercress harvest after which the Watercress Line, a heritage steam railway, is named.

Course

The river rises at a spring in the parish of Bishop's Sutton, 800 metres east of the old core of the village. Flowing west, the lesser-populated north bank of the village has the first of its three little crossings, Water Lane, a ford. Here the Alre runs between the parish church of St Nicholas and the site of the former bishop's palace, owned by the Bishop of Winchester for centuries, that gives the village its name.

It runs through Western Court Farm, where it provides the waters for the farm's watercress beds, and soon after it runs under the railway bridge of the Mid Hants Railway, known as the Watercress Line as it used to transport watercress from New Alresford to Alton and London.

North east of Alresford, the river has been split with one channel running through the Old Alresford Pond, an artificial 12th-century stew pond that was dug to provide fish for the Bishop of Winchester. It may also have served as a balancing pond for a navigation channel dug to the south. It is now designated a Site of Special Scientific Interest.

The Alre runs just to the north of New Alresford, separating it from the smaller village of Old Alresford and forming the parish boundary between the two for much of its route. Here it runs under two water mills, Arle Mill and The Fulling Mill, as well as supporting additional watercress farms. Fulling is the process of removing oils from wool and the mill dates back to the 13th century. Derelict by the 19th century, it was saved from demolition in 1951 and is now a private residence.

Its final section flows a couple of hundred metres south west through fields into the meandering course of the River Itchen.

History

The river's name is derived from alor an Old English word for the alder tree. The name Alresford dates from at least the start of the 8th century and means 'alder tree ford', presumably an important ford of the river near a prominent alder tree, and so by extension the whole river became known by the same name, with the river named after the town rather than the other way round.

The river is still sometimes referred to as the Arle, but research suggests that this is due to 20th-century errors, rather than any earlier variation. The source of the confusion may be A J Robertson's 1937 book, History of Alresford incorrectly quoting Camden's 1586 Britannia.

Old English charter boundaries considered the River Alre to be the headwater of the Itchen. In addition, the Itchen itself was at one time referred to as the River Alre.

Daniel Defoe mentions the river in his book A tour thro' the whole island of Great Britain.

"From thence we ride to Tichfield as above, where we pass the River Alre, which rises in the same County at Alresford, or near it, which is not above Twenty-two Miles off; and yet it is a large River here, and makes a good Road below, call'd Tichfield-bay."

Water quality
The Environment Agency measure water quality of the river systems in England. Each is given an overall ecological status, which may be one of five levels: high, good, moderate, poor and bad. There are several components that are used to determine this, including biological status, which looks at the quantity and varieties of invertebrates, angiosperms and fish. Chemical status, which compares the concentrations of various chemicals against known safe concentrations, is rated good or fail.

Water quality of the River Alre in 2019:

References

Rivers of Hampshire
1Alre